Alexandre Picard (born October 9, 1985) is a Canadian professional ice hockey winger who is currently playing for HK Hradec Kralove in the Czech Republic. He was drafted by the Columbus Blue Jackets with the eighth overall pick of the 2004 NHL Entry Draft, but only appeared in 67 career NHL games. Picard is widely regarded as a draft bust.

Playing career
As a youth, Picard played in the 1999 Quebec International Pee-Wee Hockey Tournament with a minor ice hockey team from Quebec City.

After playing four full seasons in the Quebec Major Junior Hockey League (QMJHL), Picard was drafted in the first round, 8th overall, by the Columbus Blue Jackets in the 2004 NHL Entry Draft. Picard joined the Syracuse Crunch, their AHL affiliate, for the 2005–06 season. He made his National Hockey League (NHL) debut with the Blue Jackets in the same season.

On March 3, 2010, the Blue Jackets traded Picard to the Phoenix Coyotes in exchange for Chad Kolarik.

On July 7, 2011, Picard signed a one-year contract with the Tampa Bay Lightning. He was assigned to AHL affiliate, the Norfolk Admirals. On June 9, 2012, Picard won the Calder Cup with the Admirals. He was named MVP of the AHL playoff series.

Picard opted to sign a multi-year contract abroad with Swiss club, Genève-Servette HC of the National League A (NLA) from the 2012–13 season. In December 2013 and in December 2014, he won the Spengler Cup with the Genève-Servette HC. He left after three years with the club. In December 2015, Picard was added to the roster of NLA side HC Davos for the Spengler Cup, and for the third time was part of the Cup winning team. Following his good showing, Davos offered him a contract for the remainder of the 2015-16 campaign which he signed in January 2016.

Picard left Switzerland upon the conclusion of the 2015-16 season and put pen to paper on a one-year deal with Kunlun Red Star for their inaugural KHL campaign, but eventually did not play for the team. On November 29, 2016, he joined HK Hradec Kralove of the Czech Extraliga.

Career statistics

Awards
2003–04 QMJHL Mike Bossy Trophy
2012 AHL Jack Butterfield Trophy (Playoff MVP)

References

External links

1985 births
Living people
Canadian ice hockey left wingers
Columbus Blue Jackets draft picks
Columbus Blue Jackets players
Genève-Servette HC players
Lewiston Maineiacs players
National Hockey League first-round draft picks
Norfolk Admirals players
San Antonio Rampage players
Syracuse Crunch players
Ice hockey people from Quebec City
Canadian expatriate ice hockey players in Switzerland
HC Kunlun Red Star players